John Honywood  may refer to:

John Honywood (MP for Hythe), in 1504 and 1510, MP for Hythe (UK Parliament constituency)
John Lamotte Honywood (1647–1694), MP for Essex
Sir John Honywood, 4th Baronet, MP for Canterbury, Honiton and Steyning
The 3rd, 4th, 5th, 6th and 8th Honywood Baronets

See also
Honywood (surname)